

References

1860s in paleontology
Paleontology
Paleontology, 1863 In